The 7th Golden Eagle Awards were held June October 15, 1989, in Hangzhou, Zhejiang province.  Nominees and winners are listed below, winners are in bold.

Best Television Series
not awarded this year
The Last Emperor/末代皇帝
Spring House/家春秋
Big Hotel/大酒店

Best Lead Actor in a Television Series
Chen Daoming for The Last Emperor

Best Lead Actress in a Television Series
Xu Ya for Spring House

Best Supporting Actor in a Television Series
Chen Yude for unknown

Best Supporting Actress in a Television Series
not awarded this year

References

External links

1989
1989 in Chinese television
Mass media in Hangzhou